Qarah Qush-e Sofla (also Romanized as Qarah Qūsh-e Soflá and Qareh Qūsh-e Soflá; also known as Qara Kush Ashāghi, Qareh Qūsh-e Pā”īn, and Qarehqūsh Pā”īn) is a village in Sokmanabad Rural District, Safayyeh District, Khoy County, West Azerbaijan Province, Iran. At the 2006 census, its population was 102, in 28 families.

References 

Populated places in Khoy County